Elizabeth Wright Ingraham (1922 – September 15, 2013) was an American architect and educator. A granddaughter of American architect Frank Lloyd Wright, she studied under his tutelage at his Taliesin studio at age 15. She later established an architect's practice in Colorado Springs, Colorado, with her husband, Gordon Ingraham, which adhered to Wright's architectural styles. In 1970 she formed her own architectural firm, Elizabeth Wright Ingraham and Associates, which she led until her retirement in 2007. She is credited with the design of approximately 150 buildings in Colorado Springs and other western locales. She also founded and directed the Wright-Ingraham Institute, which invites students and visiting faculty to conferences and workshops on environmental issues. She was posthumously inducted into the Colorado Women's Hall of Fame in 2014.

Early life and education
Elizabeth Wright was born in 1922 in Oak Park, Illinois, to John Lloyd Wright, an architect, and his second wife Hazel (nee Lundin). She was a granddaughter of Frank Lloyd Wright. 

She decided to pursue a career in architecture at age 14. The following year, she studied at her grandfather's studio, Taliesin, under his tutelage. She went on to study architecture under Ludwig Mies van der Rohe at the Armour Institute in Chicago, and also took courses at the University of California, Berkeley.

She was a draftsman for the United States Navy in World War II. She gained her architect's license in 1947.

Career
In 1948, she and her husband, Gordon Ingraham, also an architect, moved to Colorado Springs, Colorado, to establish their own practice. They chose the city for its design opportunities and dearth of competition. Ingraham & Ingraham, Architects adhered to Frank Lloyd Wright's Usonian and Prairie styles, producing "modest homes affordable to the upper middle class". Their partnership produced more than 90 home designs in the 1950s, including the Beadles House in Colorado Springs. They also designed one home in North Dakota (the George and Beth Anderson House, entered into the National Register of Historic Places in 2017), and two homes in Minnesota.

By 1970, Wright Ingraham wanted to move away from her grandfather's styles and develop new architectural approaches. That year she founded her own firm, which she called Elizabeth Wright Ingraham and Associates. She went on to design approximately 150 buildings in Colorado Springs, including the Vista Grande Community Church (1987), an expansion of the Fountain Branch of the El Paso Country Library (2006), an upper story addition to the All Souls Unitarian Church, and the Solaz, La Casa, Kaleidoscope, Beadles, and Vradenburg private homes. Wright Ingraham retired at the age of 85.

Architectural style

Following her grandfather's lead, Wright Ingraham designed homes that had "low-slung" exteriors, integrated into the landscape, incorporated natural light, used organic building materials, and offered exceptional outdoor views. Her design for the Vista Grande Community Church used an "energy-efficient, easy-to-maintain, insulated concrete called Thermomass", being one of the first buildings in the country to do so. Her plan for the Kaleidoscope house included a  skylight.

Other activities
In 1970, the same year she founded her architectural practice, Wright Ingraham established the non-profit Wright-Ingraham Institute for the study of land use and natural resources. The institute invites students and visiting faculty to conferences and workshops on environmental issues. Wright Ingraham directed the institute for its first 20 years; it is now governed by a board that includes two of her daughters. 

Wright Ingraham also founded Crossroads, an international exchange program affiliated with Colorado College, and was a cofounder of the Women's Forum of Colorado. She also engaged in community activism, at one point participating in a peace march in Colorado Springs.

Affiliations and memberships
Wright Ingraham was a fellow of the American Institute of Architects and served as president of its Colorado chapter in 2002. She was a member of the State Board of Examiners of Architects (1980–1990) and the advisory board of the Frank Lloyd Wright Conservancy, among other advisory boards and task forces.

Awards and honors
Wright Ingraham received an honorary doctorate from the University of Colorado in 1999. She was posthumously inducted into the Colorado Women's Hall of Fame in 2014.

Personal life
She met her husband, Louis Gordon Ingraham (1915–1999), while both were studying at Taliesin. The couple had one son, Michael Lloyd Ingraham, and three daughters, Catherine Ingraham, Christine Ingraham and Anna (Ingraham) Grady. They divorced in 1974. One daughter, Catherine Ingraham, became a professor of graduate architecture and urban planning at the Pratt Institute in New York. She is a visiting professor at Harvard University.  

After residing in Colorado Springs for 65 years, Wright Ingraham moved to her son's home in San Antonio, Texas, in January 2013. She died of congestive heart failure on September 15, 2013, aged 91. Coincidentally, her grandfather Frank Lloyd Wright had died at the same age.

References

External links

Wright-Ingraham Institute home page
Slide show of Wright Ingraham house designs
Design photos
"Elizabeth Wright Ingraham ... In Her Own Words" 2012 video interview, AIA Colorado History Committee
"Elizabeth Wright Ingraham – Award-Winning Architect, Businesswoman" 2014 video, Colorado Women's Hall of Fame

1922 births
2013 deaths
20th-century American architects
American women architects
Architects from Illinois
Architects from Colorado
Frank Lloyd Wright
People from Oak Park, Illinois
People from Colorado Springs, Colorado
United States Navy personnel of World War II
University of California, Berkeley alumni